The 1909 international cricket season was from April 1909 to September 1909.

Season overview

May

Australia in England

June

Australia in Scotland

September

Ireland in North America

References

International cricket competitions by season
1909 in cricket